Faisalabad–Sangla Hill Road (Punjabi), also known locally as Sangla Jhumra Road is a provincially maintained road in Punjab that extends from Faisalabad to Sangla Hill.

Features
Length - 50 km
Lanes - Single lanes
Speed limit - Universal minimum speed limit of 40 km/h and a maximum speed limit of 60 km/h for heavy transport vehicles and 80 km/h for light transport vehicles.

References

Roads in Punjab, Pakistan
Transport in Faisalabad District